Nepenthes argentii (after George Argent) is a highland Nepenthes pitcher plant native to Mount Guiting-Guiting on Sibuyan Island in the Philippines. It is possibly the smallest species in the genus and does not appear to have a climbing stage.

Nepenthes argentii inhabits subalpine shrubbery "with a smooth wind-clipped canopy 30 cm tall on an ultrabasic ridge". It grows at an elevation of 1400–1900 m.

On Mount Guiting-Guiting, N. argentii is sympatric with N. sibuyanensis at around 1600 to 1770 m. A taxon resembling N. alata grows on Mount Guiting-Guiting at lower elevations of 800 to 1000 m; it was described as N. graciliflora by Adolph Daniel Edward Elmer. Other plant species endemic to the mountain include Lobelia proctorii and Rhododendron rousei.

Nepenthes argentii has no known natural hybrids, although it may hybridise with N. sibuyanensis. No forms or varieties have been described.

References

 Amoroso, V.B., L.D. Obsioma, J.B. Arlalejo, R.A. Aspiras, D.P. Capili, J.J.A. Polizon & E.B. Sumile 2009. Inventory and conservation of endangered, endemic and economically important flora of Hamiguitan Range, southern Philippines. Blumea 54(1–3): 71–76.  
 Amoroso, V.B. & R.A. Aspiras 2011. Hamiguitan Range: a sanctuary for native flora. Saudi Journal of Biological Sciences 18(1): 7–15. 
 Co, L. & W. Suarez 2012. Nepenthaceae. Co's Digital Flora of the Philippines.
 McPherson, S.R. & V.B. Amoroso 2011. Field Guide to the Pitcher Plants of the Philippines. Redfern Natural History Productions, Poole.
  McPherson, S. & T. Gronemeyer 2008. Die Nepenthesarten der Philippinen: eine Fotodokumentation. Das Taublatt 60: 34–78.

External links

Photographs of N. argentii at the Carnivorous Plant Photofinder
Borneo Exotics: Nepenthes argentii

Carnivorous plants of Asia
argentii
Endemic flora of the Philippines
Flora of Luzon
Vulnerable flora of Asia
Plants described in 1997
Taxa named by Matthew Jebb
Taxa named by Martin Cheek